Rhylee West (born 12 July 2000) is an Australian Rules footballer who plays for the Western Bulldogs in the Australian Football League (AFL). He was selected at pick #26 in the 2018 national draft as a father-son selection.  He made his senior debut against Fremantle in round 19 of the 2019 season.

He is the son of former Bulldogs player Scott West.

Statistics
 Statistics are correct to the end of Round 22 2022

|- style="background-color: #EAEAEA"
! scope="row" style="text-align:center" | 2019
|style="text-align:center;"|
| 14 || 3 || 2 || 0 || 16 || 22 || 38 || 7 || 3 || 0.6 || 0 || 5.3 || 7.3 || 12.6 || 2.3 || 1.0
|-
|- 
! scope="row" style="text-align:center" | 2020
|style="text-align:center;"|
| 14 || 4 || 1 || 0 || 23 || 25 || 48 || 12 || 7 || 0.3 || 0.0 || 5.8 || 6.3 || 12.0 || 3.0 || 1.8
|- style="background-color: #EAEAEA"
! scope="row" style="text-align:center" | 2021
|style="text-align:center;"|
| 14 || 4 || 0 || 2 || 6 || 3 || 9 || 2 || 3 || 0.0 || 0.5 || 1.5 || 0.7 || 2.2 || 0.5 || 0.7
|-
|- style="background-color: #EAEAEA"
! scope="row" style="text-align:center" | 2022
|style="text-align:center;"|
| 14 || 14 || 11 || 9 || 78 || 84 || 162 || 37 || 53 || 0.7 || 0.6 || 5.5 || 6.0 || 11.5 || 2.6 || 3.7
|-
|- class=sortbottom
! colspan=3 | Career
! 25 !! 14 !! 11 !! 123 !! 134 !! 257 !! 58 !! 66 !! 0.5 !! 0.4 !! 4.9 !! 5.3 !! 10.2 !! 2.3 !! 2.6
|}

Notes

References

External links

Rhylee West from AFL Tables

Western Bulldogs players
Calder Cannons players
2000 births
Living people
Australian rules footballers from Victoria (Australia)
People educated at St Kevin's College, Melbourne